Alexander Wieczerzak  (born 22 March 1991) is a German judoka.

He won a gold medal at the 2017 World Judo Championships in Budapest.

On 12 November 2022 he won a bronze medal at the 2022 European Mixed Team Judo Championships as part of team Germany.

References

External links

 
 
 

1991 births
Living people
German male judoka
World judo champions
European Games medalists in judo
European Games bronze medalists for Germany
Judoka at the 2015 European Games
Judoka at the 2019 European Games
Sportspeople from Frankfurt